Fernando Alves Santa Clara or simply Fernandinho (born April 16, 1981 in Ilhéus), is a former Brazilian left-back.

Club career

Fernando Alves Santa Clara (Fernandinho) began his professional career with Vitória in 1999. After impressing with the Brazilian side, he drew the interest of top Portuguese side FC Porto and joined them on loan in 2002. Following a brief stay in Portugal in which Fernandinho played for the FC Porto reserves he returned to Brazil joining Campeonato Brasileiro Série C side Joinville and in 2003 played for Caxias. He then moved up joining Campeonato Brasileiro Série A Club Paraná and started demonstrating his offensive prowess, scoring 7 goals in 41 matches. In 2004, he joined Criciúma which was playing in Série A and appeared in 14 matches scoring 5 goals playing primarily as a left-sided midfielder. After being relegated with Criciúma Fernandinho was loaned to top side Vasco da Gama and appeared in 18 league matches scoring 3 goals. He then returned to Criciúma now playing in Campeonato Brasileiro Série C in 2006. Upon joining Criciúma he began playing exclusively at left-back and was a key offensive player for the side, scoring 12 goals in all competitions. In 2007 for Criciúma he added another 10 goals in the Campeonato Catarinense  and was selected as the top left-back and top overall player of the Campeonato being noted for his powerful shot and attacking ability.
This led to renewed interest from top Brazilian clubs and during the 2007 season Fernandinho's contract was purchased by top Brazilian side Cruzeiro. With Cruzeiro, Fernandinho quickly established himself as the club's starting left-back and helped them capture the 2008 and 2009 Minas Gerais State League. He suffered an ACL injury in 2009 which kept him out of action for most of the 2009 season, however upon returning he has drawn interest from top European clubs AC Milan and Fenerbache, which considered him a possible replacement for the departed Roberto Carlos.
 In June 2010, Fernandinho was announced as Atlético Mineiro's new player. He signed the club after being released from Cruzeiro.

He joined Vitória, where he began his professional career, for a second spell on 23 May 2011.

Honours
Vitória
Bahia State League: 1999, 2000
Northeastern Cup: 1999

Criciúma
Santa Catarina State League: 2005
Brazilian League (3rd division): 2006

Cruzeiro
Minas Gerais State League: 2008, 2009

References

External links
 CBF
 zerozero.pt
 Lateral Fernandinho a caminho do Cruzeiro
 cruzeirense
 futpedia.globo.com

1981 births
Living people
Brazilian footballers
Esporte Clube Vitória players
FC Porto players
FC Porto B players
Joinville Esporte Clube players
Sociedade Esportiva e Recreativa Caxias do Sul players
Paraná Clube players
Criciúma Esporte Clube players
CR Vasco da Gama players
Cruzeiro Esporte Clube players
Clube Atlético Mineiro players
Associação Desportiva São Caetano players
Fortaleza Esporte Clube players
Association football fullbacks
People from Ilhéus
Sportspeople from Bahia